Borkum Great Light (from , "Borkum greater lighthouse"), also known as Borkum Neuer Light (Neuer Leuchtturm, "new lighthouse"), is an active lighthouse on the island of Borkum, Leer district, state of Lower Saxony, Germany. At a height of  it is the twenty-fourth tallest "traditional lighthouse" in the world, as well as the third tallest brick lighthouse in the world. The lighthouse is located at the west side of the Borkum Island. It is the landfall light for the Ems estuary and the port of Emden, serving also as a day mark.

The tower was built in the summer of 1879 in a record time of six months, following a fire at the old lighthouse.

The site is open, and the tower is open to the public daily April through October and on Thursday, Friday, and Sunday afternoons November through March.

See also 

 List of lighthouses and lightvessels in Germany
 List of tallest lighthouses in the world

References

External links 

 

Lighthouses completed in 1879
Lighthouses in Lower Saxony
Buildings and structures in Leer (district)
Borkum